Colfax may refer to:

People 
 Ellen Maria Colfax (1836–1911), second wife of Schuyler Colfax
 Evelyn Clark Colfax (1823–1863), first wife of Schuyler Colfax
 Schuyler Colfax (1823–1885), politician and 17th vice president of the United States
 Schuyler Colfax III (1870–1925), American politician, 11th mayor of South Bend, Illinois, and son of the Schuyler Colfax
 William Colfax (1756–1838), American Revolutionary War officer

Places 
 Colfax, Saskatchewan, Canada, an unincorporated community

United States
 Colfax, California, a city
 Colfax, Colorado, a ghost town
 Colfax, Illinois, a village
 Colfax, Indiana, a town
 Colfax, Iowa, a city
 Colfax, Louisiana, a town
 Colfax, North Carolina, an unincorporated community
 Colfax, North Dakota, a city
 Colfax, Ohio, an unincorporated community
 Colfax, Texas, an unincorporated populated place
 Colfax, Washington, a city
 Colfax, West Virginia, an unincorporated community
 Colfax, Wisconsin, a village
 Colfax (town), Wisconsin
 Colfax County, Nebraska 
 Colfax County, New Mexico
 Colfax Township (disambiguation)
 Mount Colfax, New York
 Colfax Peak, a summit near Lincoln Peak in Washington State
 Camp Colfax, a post in the military district of Oregon

Transportation
 Colfax Avenue, a major east–west thoroughfare in Denver, Colorado
 Colfax station, Colfax, California, an Amtrak train station
 Colfax station (RTD), Aurora, Colorado, a light rail station
 Colfax Airport, Colfax, Louisiana

Other uses 
 , a U.S. Revenue Cutter Service cutter; see USRC Boutwell (1873)
 Colfax High School (disambiguation)
 Colfax Elementary School, Pittsburgh, Pennsylvania, on the National Register of Historic Places
 Colfax (genus), a genus of beetles in the family Carabidae
 Colfax Corporation, an American company
 AMD Colfax, CPUs of the Zen+ Threadripper line by Advanced Micro Devices
 Colfax Theater, a theater building in South Bend, Indiana, on the National Register of Historic Places

See also 
 
 Colefax Group